USS James H. Clark (SP-759) was a United States Navy tug in commission from 1917 to 1920.

James H. Clark was built as a commercial steam tug of the same name in 1900 at Buffalo, New York. On 19 July 1917, the U.S. Navy acquired her from her owner, the Tampa Towing & Lighterage Company of Tampa, Florida, for use during World War I. Assigned the section patrol number 759, she was commissioned on 21 August 1917 as USS James H. Clark (SP-759).

Assigned to the 7th Naval District and based at Key West, Florida, James H. Clark performed towing and other miscellaneous duties in the harbor at Key West and at Naval Station Key West until 1920.

James H. Clark was decommissioned on 6 April 1920 and was sold on 16 May 1921 to the A. C. Tuxbury Lumber Company of Charleston, South Carolina.

Notes

References

SP-759 James H. Clark at Department of the Navy Naval History and Heritage Command Online Library of Selected Images: U.S. Navy Ships -- Listed by Hull Number "SP" #s and "ID" #s -- World War I Era Patrol Vessels and other Acquired Ships and Craft numbered from SP-700 through SP-799
NavSource Online: Section Patrol Craft Photo Archive James H. Clark (SP 759)

Tugs of the United States Navy
World War I auxiliary ships of the United States
Ships built in Buffalo, New York
1900 ships